John Marshall (date of birth unknown) wrote a noted biography of Charles Lennox, 2nd Duke of Richmond entitled The Duke who was Cricket. Much of the book focused on Richmond's career as a patron of Sussex cricket. The book was published in 1961 by Frederick Muller Ltd.

References

Bibliography
 

Date of birth unknown
Cricket historians and writers
Living people
Year of birth missing (living people)